Yuen-Ron Shen is a Chinese physicist. He is a professor emeritus of physics at the University of California, Berkeley, known for his work on non-linear optics. He was born in Shanghai and graduated from National Taiwan University. He received his Ph.D. in Applied Physics from Harvard under physicist and Nobel Laureate Nicolaas Bloembergen in 1963, and joined the department of physics at Berkeley in 1964. In the early years, Shen was probably best known for his work on self-focusing and filament propagation of laser beams in materials. These fundamental studies enabled the creation of ultrafast supercontinuum light sources. In the 1970s and 1980s, he collaborated with Yuan T. Lee on the study of multiphoton dissociation of molecular clusters. The molecular-beam photofragmentation translational spectroscopy that they developed has clarified much of the initial confusion concerning the dynamics of infrared multiphoton dissociation processes. In the 1980s and 1990s, Shen developed various nonlinear optics methods for the study of material surfaces and interfaces. Among these techniques, second-harmonic generation and sum frequency generation spectroscopy are best known and now widely used by scientists from various fields. He has collaborated with Gabor Somorjai on the use of the technique of Sum Frequency Generation Spectroscopy to study catalyst surfaces. He is the author of the book The Principles of Nonlinear Optics. Shen belongs to the prolific J. J. Thomson academic lineage tree. Currently, Shen works in U. C. Berkeley and Fudan University in Shanghai.

Awards and honors
 American Academy of Arts and Sciences, member 1990
 National Academy of Sciences, member 1995
 Academia Sinica (Taiwan), member 1990
 Chinese Academy of Sciences, member 1996
 American Physical Society, fellow
 Optical Society of America, fellow
 American Association for the Advancement of Science, fellow
 Sloan Research Fellowship, 1966–68
 Guggenheim Fellow, 1972–73
 Miller Professor, 1975, 1981
 Alexander von Humboldt Award, 1984
 C. H. Townes Award, Optical Society of America, 1986
 Arthur L. Schawlow Prize in Laser Science, 1992
 Max Planck Research Prize, 1996
 Frank Isakson Prize for Optical Effects in Solids, 1998
 International Science and Technology Cooperation Award, China 2008
 DOE Award for Outstanding Scientific Accomplishments in Solid State Physics, 1983
 DOE Award for Sustained Outstanding Research in Solid State Physics, 1987
 DOE Award for Significant Implications for DOE-Related Technologies, 1997.

References

External links 
 UC Berkeley Physics Dept. Faculty Page
 Shen Group website

Living people
Fellows of the American Association for the Advancement of Science
Foreign members of the Chinese Academy of Sciences
Academic staff of Fudan University
Nanyang Model High School alumni
Harvard School of Engineering and Applied Sciences alumni
Members of Academia Sinica
Fellows of Optica (society)
Members of the United States National Academy of Sciences
National Taiwan University alumni
Physicists from Shanghai
Sloan Research Fellows
University of California, Berkeley faculty
Year of birth missing (living people)
Fellows of the American Physical Society